Ben Harrell (March 15, 1911 – July 26, 1981) was a United States Army four star general who served as Commander, Allied Land Forces South East Europe from 1968 to 1971. A 1933 graduate of the United States Military Academy, Harrell also served as the Commander of the Sixth United States Army and the 101st Airborne Division, and as a member of the Howze Board.

During World War II, Harrell served as commanding officer of the 7th Infantry Regiment. He was awarded the Silver Star Medal and two Bronze Star Medals. Harrell was later sent to study at the National War College in 1951, graduating in 1952.

Harrell was born in Medford, Oregon on March 15, 1911. He died in 1981 and was interred at San Francisco National Cemetery.

See also

List of United States Army four-star generals

References

1911 births
1981 deaths
People from Medford, Oregon
United States Military Academy alumni
United States Army personnel of World War II
Recipients of the Silver Star
National War College alumni
Recipients of the Legion of Merit
United States Army generals
Recipients of the Distinguished Service Medal (US Army)
Burials at San Francisco National Cemetery
Military personnel from Oregon